Sharon Deacon (née Amiet) (born 30 November 1957) is a former Australian women's basketball player.

Biography

Deacon played for the Australia women's national basketball team during the late 1970s and early 1980s and competed for Australia at the 1979 World Championship held in South Korea and the 1983 World Championship held in Brazil. In the domestic Women's National Basketball League (WNBL), Deacon played 112 games for the Melbourne Telstars (1981) and Melbourne East Spectres (1982 - 1990).

References

1957 births
Living people
Australian women's basketball players
People from Korumburra